Francesco Buglio (born 21 May 1957) is a football coach.

Playing career
As a footballer, he played shortly in Varese (having his debut in 1974–75 Serie A) and Viareggio youth teams. Ha played also as a forward at Salernitana. He soon retired from active football because of health reasons, then he pursued a coaching career.

Coaching career
For a decade Buglio trained little Tuscany teams, following Marcello Lippi as vice during his experience with A.C. Pistoiese (1987).

In his career he won two Serie D championships with Viareggio and Aglianese and reached a promotion from Serie C2 to Serie C1 with San Marino Calcio.

Lately he trained Alessandria in Lega Pro Prima Divisione; in the same team played his son Angelo Buglio.

On 13 June 2018, he returned to Casale in Serie D.

References

1957 births
Living people
Footballers from Catania
Italian footballers
Association football forwards
S.S.D. Varese Calcio players
U.S. Salernitana 1919 players
Italian football managers
Expatriate football managers in San Marino
A.S.D. Victor San Marino managers
U.S. Alessandria Calcio 1912 managers
S.P.A.L. managers
U.S. Pistoiese 1921 managers
A.S.D. Calcio Ivrea managers
Casale F.B.C. managers
Footballers from Sicily